José Pablo Quirós Quirós  (1905–1988) was a Costa Rican politician. Son of Juan Bautista Quirós Segura.

Costa Rican politicians
1905 births
1988 deaths
Children of national leaders